Předmostí 3 was an Upper Paleolithic Homo sapiens from the Czech Republic, geologically dated to the Late Pleistocene.

Description
It was found in Předmostí, Moravia, and  dated to 26,000 B.P. and has a cranial capacity of 1580 cubic centimetres (Holloway 2000;Holloway et al 2004)

Fate
The specimen was  destroyed in 1945 in the Second World War as retreating German troops set fire to Mikulov Castle where the remains were stored.

Analysis
In a morphometric analysis of cranio-facial traits compared to modern humans,  Předmostí 3 was found to correlate to a 73% similarity.

The skull belongs to a morphological Upper Palaeolithic group that also includes Grotte des Enfants 4, Barma Grande 5, Pavlov 1 and Sunghir 1.
Predmosti 3 had a retromolar space, which is absent from most modern humans. Předmostí 3's hand is similar to that of the Middle Paleolithic Skhul IV.

References 

Hominin fossils
Pleistocene primates
Archaeology of the Czech Republic
Quaternary fossil record